A list of college football seasons from the first season in 1869 until the NCAA's single division split into Division I, Division II, and Division III in 1973 and then Division I split again into Division I-A and Division I-AA in 1978. Founded as the Intercollegiate Athletic Association of the United States in 1906, the NCAA adopted its current name in 1910. Also included are teams from the National Association of Intercollegiate Athletics, which has held its own football championship since 1956.

Pre-regulation (1869–1905)

NCAA (1906–present)

Single division (1906–1955)

University and College Divisions (1956–1972)

Division I only (1973–1977)

After the 1972 season, the Central Intercollegiate Athletic Association, Far Western Football Conference, Great Lakes Intercollegiate Athletic Conference, Gulf South Conference, Lone Star Conference, Missouri Intercollegiate Athletic Association, North Central Conference, Northern Intercollegiate Conference, Pennsylvania State Athletic Conference, Rocky Mountain Athletic Conference, the Southern Intercollegiate Athletic Conference, and the Southland Conference became part of Division II. The inaugural NCAA Division II Football Championship was played in Sacramento, California in December 1973 following the 1973 NCAA Division II football season. Division II is differentiated from Division I by its reduced number of athletic scholarships. At the same time, the College Athletic Conference, College Conference of Illinois and Wisconsin, Independent College Athletic Conference, Iowa Intercollegiate Athletic Conference, Michigan Intercollegiate Athletic Association, Middle Atlantic Conference, Midwest Collegiate Athletic Conference, Minnesota Intercollegiate Athletic Conference, New England Football Conference, New Jersey State Athletic Conference, Northwest Conference, Southern Intercollegiate Athletic Conference, Southern California Intercollegiate Athletic Conference, and the Wisconsin Intercollegiate Athletic Conference became members of Division III. The inaugural NCAA Division III Football Championship was played in Phenix City, Alabama in December 1973 following the 1973 NCAA Division III football season. Division III schools, unlike higher NCAA divisions, are not permitted to grant any athletic scholarships.

Division I-A/FBS and I-AA/FCS split (1978–present)

After the 1977 season, the Big Sky Conference, Mid-Eastern Athletic Conference, Ohio Valley Conference, Southwestern Athletic Conference, and the Yankee Conference became part of Division I–AA (now the FCS). The inaugural NCAA Division I Football Championship was played in Wichita Falls, Texas on December 16, 1978 following the 1978 NCAA Division I-AA football season. Division I–AA (now FCS) schools are usually smaller in size than Division I–A (now FBS) schools while they also offer fewer athletic scholarships. The Ivy League, Southern Conference, and Southland Conference would also eventually make the transition from I-A to I-AA in subsequent years.

References

List of college football seasons
List of college football seasons
List of college football seasons
List of college football seasons
List of college football seasons